The 1969 Speedway World Team Cup was the tenth edition of the FIM Speedway World Team Cup to determine the team world champions.

The final took place at the Rybnik Municipal Stadium in Rybnik, Poland. The host nation won the title for the fourth time.

Qualification

British Round
Great Britain seeded to Final (Commonwealth riders eligible for the British team)

Scandinavian Round
 June 5
  Oslo

* Sweden to Final

Contmnental Round
Continental Semifinal
 June 15
  Maribor

* East Germany to Continental Final

Continental Final
 August 3
  Leningrad
 Att: 9,000

* Soviet Union and Poland to Final

World Final
 21 September
  Rybnik, Rybnik Municipal Stadium
 Att: 45,000

See also
 1969 Individual Speedway World Championship
 1969 Speedway World Pairs Championship

References

1969
World T